In computer science, a vectored interrupt is a processing technique in which the interrupting device directs the processor to the appropriate interrupt service routine. This is in contrast to a polled interrupt system, in which a single interrupt service routine must determine the source of the interrupt by checking all potential interrupt sources, a slow and relatively laborious process.

Implementation
Vectored interrupts are achieved by assigning each interrupting device a unique code, typically four to eight bits in length. When a device interrupts, it sends its unique code over the data bus to the processor, telling the processor which interrupt service routine to execute.

References

Computer architecture
Interrupts